Alpatlahuac is a municipality in Veracruz, Mexico. It is located about 161 km from state capital Xalapa to the south-west. It has a surface of 75,7 km2.

The municipality of Alpatlahuac is delimited to the south by Coscomatepec and to the north by the Calcahualco.

It produces maize and rice.

References

External links 

  Municipal Official Site
  Municipal Official Information

Municipalities of Veracruz